Ellicottville Town Hall is a historic town hall building located at Ellicottville, New York in Cattaraugus County, New York. It was erected in 1829, as the Cattaraugus County Court House. It is a two-story brick structure set on a limestone foundation.  The structure features a distinctive cupola. Much of the original interior was destroyed by a fire in 1969.

It was listed on the National Register of Historic Places in 1973.

References

External links
Ellicottville Town Hall - Ellicottville, NY - U.S. National Register of Historic Places on Waymarking.com

City and town halls on the National Register of Historic Places in New York (state)
Government buildings completed in 1829
Buildings and structures in Cattaraugus County, New York
National Register of Historic Places in Cattaraugus County, New York